Estonian Hunting Sport Association (abbreviation EHSA) is one of the sport governing bodies in Estonia which deals with hunting sport.

EHSA is a member of Fédération Internationale de Tir aux Armes Sportives de Chasse (FITASC).

See also
 Estonian Shooting Sport Federation
 Estonian Practical Shooting Association

References

External links
 

Sports governing bodies in Estonia
Shooting sports in Estonia